Talk to Me is an American sitcom television series created by Suzanne Martin. The series stars Kyra Sedgwick, Beverly D'Angelo, David Newsom, Nicole Sullivan, Peter Jacobson, Max Baker and Michael Estime. The series aired on ABC from April 11 until April 25, 2000.

Cast 
Kyra Sedgwick as Janey Munroe
Beverly D'Angelo as Dr. Debra
David Newsom as Rob
Nicole Sullivan as Kat Munroe 
Peter Jacobson as Sandy
Max Baker as Marshall
Michael Estime as Cam

Episodes

References

External links
 

2000s American sitcoms
2000 American television series debuts
2000 American television series endings
English-language television shows
American Broadcasting Company original programming
Television shows set in New York City
Television series by ABC Studios